Stephen Phillips (born 30 May 1980) is an Australian cricketer. He played two Twenty20 matches for New South Wales between in 2005/06.

See also
 List of New South Wales representative cricketers

References

External links
 

1980 births
Living people
Australian cricketers
New South Wales cricketers
Cricketers from Sydney